Offinso South is one of the constituencies represented in the Parliament of Ghana. It elects one Member of Parliament (MP) by the first past the post system of election. Offinso South is located in the Offinso district  of the Ashanti Region of Ghana.

Boundaries
The seat is located within the Offinso district of the Ashanti Region of Ghana.

Members of Parliament

Elections

 
 
 
 
 
 
 

At the by-election held on 24 October 2006, the New Patriotic Party (NPP) candidate, Owusu Achaw Duah, won the seat with a majority of 10,097.

See also
List of Ghana Parliament constituencies

References 

Parliamentary constituencies in the Ashanti Region